Xanthidae is a family of crabs known as gorilla crabs, mud crabs, pebble crabs or rubble crabs. The toxins are similar to the tetrodotoxin and saxitoxin produced by puffer fish, and may be produced by bacteria in the genus Vibrio living in symbiosis with the crabs, mostly V. alginolyticus and V. parahaemolyticus.

Classification
Many species formerly included in the family Xanthidae have since been moved to new families. Despite this, Xanthidae is still the  largest crab family in terms of species richness, with 572 species in 133 genera divided among the thirteen subfamilies:

Actaeinae Alcock, 1898
Actaea De Haan, 1833
Actaeodes Dana, 1851
Actaeops † Portell & Collins, 2004
Allactaea Williams, 1974
Epiactaea Serène, 1984
Epiactaeodes Serène, 1984
Forestia Guinot, 1976
Gaillardiellus Guinot, 1976
Heteractaea Lockington, 1877
Lobiactaea T. Sakai, 1983
Meractaea Serène, 1984
Novactaea Guinot, 1976
Odhneria T. Sakai, 1983
Paractaea Guinot, 1969
Paractaeopsis Serène, 1984
Phlyctenodes † A. Milne-Edwards, 1862
Platyactaea Guinot, 1967
Psaumis Kossmann, 1877
Pseudactaea Serène, 1962
Pseudoliomera Odhner, 1925
Pseudophlyctenodes † Busulini, Tessier & Beschin, 2006
Rata Davie, 1993
Serenius Guinot, 1976
Antrocarcininae Ng & D. G. B. Chia, 1994
Antrocarcinus Ng & D. G. B. Chia, 1994
Cyrtocarcinus Ng & D. G. B. Chia, 1994
Glyptocarcinus Takeda, 1973
Chlorodiellinae Ng & Holthuis, 2007
Chlorodiella Rathbun, 1897
Cyclodius Dana, 1851
Garthiella Titgen, 1986
Liocarpiloides Klunzinger, 1913
Pilodius Dana, 1851
Sulcodius P. F. Clark & Ng, 1999
Tweedieia Ward, 1935
Vellodius Ng & Yang, 1998
Cymoinae Alcock, 1898
Cymo De Haan, 1833
Etisinae Ortmann, 1893
Etisus H. Milne-Edwards, 1834
Paraetisus Ward, 1933
Euxanthinae Alcock, 1898
Alainodaeus Davie, 1993
Batodaeus Vázquez-Bader & Gracia, 2004
Carpoporus Stimpson, 1871
Cranaothus Ng, 1993
Crosnierius Serène & Vadon, 1981
Danielea Ng & P. F. Clark, 2003
Edwardsium Guinot, 1967
Epistocavea Davie, 1993
Euxanthus Dana, 1851
Guinotellus Serène, 1971
Hepatoporus Serène, 1984
Hypocolpus Rathbun, 1897
Ladomedaeus Števčić, 2005
Lipaesthesius Rathbun, 1898
Medaeops Guinot, 1967
Medaeus Dana, 1851
Miersiella Guinot, 1967
Monodaeus Guinot, 1967
Olenothus Ng, 2002
Palatigum Davie, 1997
Paramedaeus Guinot, 1967
Pleurocolpus Crosnier, 1995
Pseudomedaeus Guinot, 1968
Rizalthus Mendoza & Ng, 2008
Visayax Mendoza & Ng, 2008
Glyptoxanthinae Mendoza & Guinot, 2011 
Glyptoxanthus A. Milne-Edwards, 1879
Kraussiinae Ng, 1993
Garthasia Ng, 1993
Kraussia Dana, 1852
Palapedia Ng, 1993
Liomerinae T. Sakai, 1976
Actiomera Ng, Guinot & Davie, 2008
Bruciana Serène, 1977
Liomera Dana, 1851
Meriola Davie, 1993
Neoliomera Odhner, 1925
Neomeria † C.-H. Hu & Tao, 1996
Paraliomera Rathbun, 1930
Polydectinae Dana, 1851
Lybia H. Milne-Edwards, 1834
Polydectus H. Milne-Edwards, 1837
Speocarcininae Števčić, 2005
Speocarcinus Stimpson, 1859
Trichia
Trichia dromiaeformis
Xanthinae MacLeay, 1838
Cataleptodius Guinot, 1968
Coralliope Guinot, 1967
Cycloxanthops Rathbun, 1897
Demania Laurie, 1906
Ectaesthesius Rathbun, 1898
Epixanthops Serène, 1984
Eucratodes A. Milne-Edwards, 1880
Euryxanthops Garth & Kim, 1983
Garthiope Guinot, 1990
Gaudichaudia Rathbun, 1930
Gonopanope Guinot, 1967
Guitonia Garth & Iliffe, 1992
Jacforus Ng & P. F. Clark, 2003
Juxtaxanthias Ward, 1942
Lachnopodus Stimpson, 1858
Leptodius A. Milne-Edwards, 1863
Liagore De Haan, 1833
Linnaeoxanthus Števčić, 2005
Lioxanthodes Calman, 1909
Macromedaeus Ward, 1942
Marratha Ng & P. F. Clark, 2003
Megametope Filhol, 1886
Megamia † Karasawa, 1993
Melybia Stimpson, 1871
Metaxanthops Serène, 1984
Metopoxantho † De Man, 1904
Microcassiope Guinot, 1967
Micropanope Stimpson, 1871
Nanocassiope Guinot, 1967
Nectopanope Wood-Mason & Alcock, 1891
Neolioxantho Garth & Kim, 1983
Neoxanthias Ward, 1932
Neoxanthops Guinot, 1968
Orphnoxanthus Alcock, 1896
Ovatis Ng & H.-I. Chen, 2004
Palaeoxanthops † Karasawa, 1993
Paraxanthias Odhner, 1925
Paraxanthodes Guinot, 1968
Paraxanthus Lucas, 1844
Xanthias Rathbun, 1897
Xantho Leach, 1814
Xanthodius Stimpson, 1859
Zalasiinae Serène, 1968
Banareia A. Milne-Edwards, 1869
Calvactaea Ward, 1933
Zalasius Rathbun, 1897
Zosiminae Alcock, 1898
Atergatis De Haan, 1833
Atergatopsis A. Milne-Edwards, 1862
Lophozozymus A. Milne-Edwards, 1863
Paratergatis T. Sakai, 1965
Platypodia Bell, 1835
Platypodiella Guinot, 1967
Pulcratis Ng & Huang, 1977
Zosimus Leach, 1818
Zozymodes Heller, 1861
Incertae sedis
Haydnella † Müller, 1984
Nogarolia † Beschin, Busulini, De Angeli & Tessier, 1994
Sculptoplax † Müller & Collins, 1991

References

External links

Xanthoidea
Decapod families